Joseph Lee Moore, Jr. (born June 29, 1949) is a former American football running back. He was drafted in the first round (11th overall) of the 1971 NFL Draft by the Chicago Bears after playing college football for Missouri.

College career
At Missouri, he became the school's all-time leading rusher, and in 1969, he broke the school's record for the most rushing yards in a season with 1,312 yards. In his senior year in 1970, Moore was among the nation's top running backs in five games, rushing for 610 yards until he suffered a shoulder injury. Moore ended his college career with eleven 100-yards rushing games in his career, which remains the highest by any Missouri player, and in 1995, he was inducted into the University of Missouri Hall of Fame.

Professional career
However, in the National Football League, Moore failed to stay healthy, along with having to follow Bears legend Gale Sayers' footsteps, and managed only 281 yards on 87 carries with no touchdowns in 23 games during two seasons with the Bears, while averaging just 3.2 yards per carry. Moore also had five receptions for 39 yards, along with a punt return for no yards. Moore played in nine games in his rookie season of 1971, running for 90 yards and recording 22 receiving yards, as Chicago finished 6–8. Two years later, in his final season, Moore appeared in all 14 games, recording 191 rushing yards and 17 receiving yards, and the Bears finished with a record of 3–11.

Post-football career
Moore later became a track coach, and coached the Berkeley High School girls track team to a Missouri state championship in 1993.

Personal life
Moore was married to Fran Moore; they had three children, David, Jasmine, and Joseph.

References

Living people
1949 births
Players of American football from St. Louis
American football running backs
Missouri Tigers football players
Chicago Bears players